Tsuneonella amylolytica is a Gram-negative, aerobic and motile bacterium from the genus Tsuneonella which has been isolated from sediments from the Taihu Lake in China.

References 

Sphingomonadales
Bacteria described in 2019